"His Girl" is a song written by Johnny Cowell and performed by The Guess Who.  In its original recorded version, it reached #19 in Canada.  A remixed version, with an overdubbed string section and other embellishments, reached #45 in the United Kingdom in 1967.  The song was also released in the United States as a single in February 1967, but it did not chart.

The song was produced by Bob Burns, with production on the overdubbed UK version being credited to both Burns and John Edwards.

The B-side "It's My Pride" was included on the 2001 box set Nuggets II: Original Artyfacts from the British Empire and Beyond, 1964–1969.

References

1966 songs
1966 singles
The Guess Who songs
Quality Records singles
Songs written by Johnny Cowell